Bruskmoal bresk is a species of beetle in the family Carabidae, the only species in the genus Bruskmoal.

References

Platyninae